Qeshlaq-e Khiallu (also Romanized as Qeshlāq-e Khīāllū; also known as Qeshlāq-e Khīārlū) is a village in Qeshlaq Rural District, in the Central District of Ahar County, East Azerbaijan Province, Iran. At the 2006 census, its population was 44, in 9 families.

References 

Populated places in Ahar County